Corinna Putnam Smith (born, Corinna Haven Putnam; later, Corinna Lindon Smith; September 27, 1876 – died 1965) was an American writer, amateur archaeologist, scholar of Arabic and Islam, and an activist.

Life
Corinna Haven Putnam was born in New York, September 27, 1876. She was the daughter of the publisher George Haven Putnam. 
In 1898, she met the painter Joseph Lindon Smith whom she married in 1899. Together, they spent many winters on archaeological sites in Egypt, while the summer months saw them hosting large social events in Dublin, New Hampshire, attended by the likes of Mark Twain and John Singer Sargent. After the death of her husband in 1950, she adopted his middle name, calling herself "Corinna Lindon Smith".

Publications
Rising Above the Ruins in France: An Account of the Progress Made Since the Armistice in the Devastated Regions in Reestablishing Industrial Activities and the Normal Life of the People, New York and London, G.P. Putnam's Sons 1920 (with Caroline R. Hill)
(Editor of:) Joseph Lindon Smith, Tombs, Temples, and Ancient Art, Norman, University of Oklahoma Press 1956
Interesting People: Eighty Years With the Great and Near Great, Norman, University of Oklahoma Press 1962

References

External links
 Papers of Corinna Lindon Smith, 1851-1966: A Finding Aid. 
 Schlesinger Library, Radcliffe Institute, Harvard University.

1876 births
1965 deaths
20th-century American non-fiction writers
20th-century American women writers